The Nevada Wing of Civil Air Patrol (CAP) is the highest echelon of Civil Air Patrol in the state of Nevada. Nevada Wing headquarters are located in Reno, Nevada. The Nevada Wing consists of over 550 cadet and adult members at locations across the state of Nevada.

Mission 
Civil Air Patrol executes its three primary missions: providing emergency services; offering cadet programs for youth; and providing aerospace education for Civil Air Patrol members and the general public. Website: https://nvwg.cap.gov

Emergency services
Civil Air Patrol performs emergency services missions, including search and rescue and disaster relief missions. CAP also provides aid during humanitarian aid assignments. CAP offers Air Force support through the conducting of light transport, communications support, and low-altitude route surveys. Civil Air Patrol also offers support to counter-drug missions.

https://www.gocivilairpatrol.com/programs/emergency-services

Cadet Programs
Civil Air Patrol runs a cadet program for youth aged 12 to 21, which covers several topics, including aerospace education, leadership training, physical fitness and moral leadership. Cadets meet on average 2 hours per week and one Saturday per month, and have opportunities to attend leadership encampments, career academies, and other activities during the summer.

Aerospace Education 
Civil Air Patrol offers aerospace education for members and the public. Civil Air Patrol provides training to the members of CAP, and by offering workshops for youth throughout the nation via schools and public aviation events.

Nevada Wing History 
Nevada Wing was chartered on 18 December 1941 and contributed to the nation through search and rescue and military support roles during the Second World War. Since then, Nevada Wing has provided search and rescue (SAR) capabilities throughout the nation’s seventh largest state. It took the lead in the nation’s largest SAR event, the 2007 Steve Fossett Search. Read more here: https://nvwg.cap.gov/about/nevada-wings-80th-anniversary

Organization

In popular culture
The Nevada Wing is featured prominently in the Dale Brown novel A Time For Patriots.

See also
Awards and decorations of Civil Air Patrol
Nevada Air National Guard

References

External links
Nevada Wing Civil Air Patrol official website

Wings of the Civil Air Patrol
Education in Nevada
Military in Nevada